Anjana Sukhani (born 10 December 1978) is an Indian actress and model, who predominantly appears in Hindi  and a few Telugu films and one Kannada films.

Early life
Anjana was born on 10 December 1978 in Jaipur to Preethi and Om Sukhani and has an older brother. She received her master's degree at Cardiff Metropolitan University.

Film and modelling career

Sukhani put her academic pursuits behind to pursue acting. During the early years of her career, she was cast in a television advertisement for Cadbury Dairy Milk chocolates with the Bollywood superstar Amitabh Bachchan. She was also noted for her performance in the remixed Hindi music video for the song Ghar Jayegi. Even though she does not have a film industry related background, she has figured in sizeable roles like in the 2007 multi-starrer blockbuster film Salaam-e-Ishq, following which she starred in Golmaal Returns, a sequel to the 2006 hit film Golmaal. Her other releases were Jai Veeru, Jashnn and her Kannada debut film Maleyali Jotheyali alongside Ganesh and Yuvika Chaudhary. She has been cast in Tollywood actor Ravi Teja's film Don Seenu marking her second film in Telugu after Naa Oopiri (2005). In 2016, Anjana made her debut in Marathi cinema opposite Swapnil Joshi in Laal Ishq, a Sanjay Leela Bhansali Production directed by Swapna Waghmare Joshi.

Filmography

TV shows
Fear Factor: Khatron Ke Khiladi on Colors TV

See also
 List of Indian film actresses

References

External links 

 
 

1978 births
21st-century Indian actresses
Actresses from Jaipur
Actresses in Hindi cinema
Actresses in Kannada cinema
Actresses in Marathi cinema
Actresses in Telugu cinema
Fear Factor: Khatron Ke Khiladi participants
Female models from Rajasthan
Indian film actresses
Living people